Edward L. Wilson (born September 5, 1931, in Ferndale, California) is an American civil engineer and academic who is known for his contributions to the development of finite element method. He was the T.Y. and Margaret Lin Professor in Engineering at the University of California, Berkeley. He is currently the professor emeritus at the civil and environmental engineering, UC Berkeley. Wilson is a member of the National Academy of Engineering and is a recipient of the John von Neumann Award.

Wilson is considered to be one of the early pioneers in the field of finite element analysis and its applications. He is credited with having written the first widely accepted computer package for structural analysis (SAP) and has co-authored the widely cited book in FEM, "Numerical Methods in Finite Element Analysis", with Klaus-Jurgen Bathe.

Born in Ferndale, California, Wilson received his B.S., M.S., and D.Eng. degrees from the University of California, Berkeley in 1955, 1959, and 1963 respectively. He earned the master's and a doctoral degree under Ray W. Clough.

References

UC Berkeley College of Engineering alumni
UC Berkeley College of Engineering faculty
Living people
Members of the United States National Academy of Engineering
1931 births
People from Ferndale, California
Engineers from California